The Kosovar ambassador in Paris is the official representative of the Government in Pristina to the Government of France.

List of representatives

References 

 
France
Kosovo